The History of Rome or Roman History usually refers to either

 The history of the city of Rome in present-day Italy
 The history of the various states established by the city of Rome in antiquity, covered separately in
 History of the Roman Kingdom
 History of the Roman Republic
 History of the Roman Empire, sometimes inclusive of the History of the Byzantine Empire

They may also refer to:

 The history of other places named Rome, including:
 History of Rome, Georgia

 Works entitled or referenced as "The History of Rome" or "Roman History":
 Roman History (Fabius Pictor), a lost work completed in the late 3rd centuryBC
 History of Rome (Alimentus), another name for his Annals, a lost work completed around 200BC
 History of Rome (Cato), another name for his Origins, a lost work completed in the mid-2nd centuryBC 
 History of Rome (Hemina), another name for his Annals, a lost work completed in the mid-2nd centuryBC
 History of Rome (Gellius), a lost work completed in the mid-2nd centuryBC
 History of Rome (Quadrigarius), a lost work completed in the 1st centuryBC
 History of Rome (Macer), a lost work completed in the 1st centuryBC
 Roman History (Antias), another name for his annals, a lost work completed in the 1st centuryBC
 History of Rome (Livy), another name for his Ab Urbe Condita Libri, completed in 9BC 
 Roman History (Velleius), another name for his Compendium of Roman History, completed in the early 1st century
 Roman History (Appian), a lost work completed in the mid-2nd century
 Roman History (Cassius Dio), completed in the 230s
 Roman History (Eutropius), another name for his Brevarium Historiae Romanae, completed in the 360s
 Roman History (Ammianus Marcellinus), another name for his Rerum Gestarum Libri, completed in the 380s
 The History of Rome (Wotton), from the reign of Commodus to the end of the Severan dynasty, completed in 1701
 The Roman History (Rollin), abandoned in 1741 and variously completed by others
 Roman History (Bower), completed in 1748, Vols. XII, XIII, XIV, & XV of An Universal History
 Roman History (Hooke), completed in 1771
 Roman History (Goldsmith), another name for Mr Goldsmith's Roman History Abridged by Himself for the Use of Schools, completed in 1772
 Elements of the Roman History (Cobbett), completed in 1828
 History of Rome (Malden), completed in 1830 for the Society for the Diffusion of Useful Knowledge
 History of Rome (Niebuhr), completed in 1832
 A History of Rome,  completed in 1833, Vols. XLIX & LXXIII of Lardner's Cabinet Cyclopædia
 The History of Rome (Keightley), completed in 1836
 History of Rome (Arnold), abandoned in 1842
 The History of Rome (Schmitz), completed in 1851
 A History of Rome (Liddell), completed in 1855
 History of Rome (Mommsen), completed in 1856
 History of Rome (Merivale) may refer to either of
 History of the Romans under the Empire, completed in 1862
 A General History of Rome, completed in 1875
 History of Rome (Yonge), another name for her Young Folks' History of Rome, completed in 1878
 History of Rome (Creighton), completed in 1880
 History of Rome and the Roman People (Duruy), completed in 1885
 Roman History (Ihne), completed in 1890 and also translated under the name The History of Rome
 A History of Rome (Greenidge), abandoned in 1904
 A Short History of Rome (Abbott), completed in 1906
 A Short History of Rome (Ferrero & Barbagallo), an abridgment of Ferrero's Grandezza e Decadenza di Roma completed in 1919
 A History of Rome (Cary), completed in 1935
 A History of Rome (Robinson), completed in 1941
 The History of Rome (Grant), completed in 1979
 The History of Rome (podcast), also known as THoR

See also
 Timeline of the city of Rome
 Timeline of Roman history
 The Matter of Rome
 Roman historiography & Historiography of the fall of the Western Roman Empire
 Annals & Annalists
 History of the Papacy, also known as the "Diocese of Rome"
 History of the Roman Canon of Christian worship
 History of the Romani people, also known as the "Roma"

History of Rome